The 2005 season was the Arizona Cardinals' 86th in the National Football League (NFL), their 107th overall and their 18th in Arizona. The team was unable to improve upon their 6–10 record from the previous season, and failed to make the playoffs for the seventh year in a row.

The October 2 game was the first regular season game to be played outside the United States, and was known as NFL Futbol Americano. The game was a Cardinals home game, and the Cardinals defeated their division rivals, the San Francisco 49ers, 31–14.

The Cardinals, as a team, had a paltry 1,138 rushing yards in 2005, only 71.1 yards per game. Remarkably, the Cardinals only had one 100-yard rushing game, when they ran for 129 yards in the season finale against the Indianapolis Colts. Arizona's season total is the fifth-fewest rushing yards by a team in a 16-game season.

The Cardinals passing offense, however, led the league, with 4,437 yards. Kurt Warner's 271.3 passing yards per game were third in the NFL, and his 24.2 pass completions per-game led the league. Wide receiver Larry Fitzgerald tied for the league lead in receptions, with 103, edging out his teammate Anquan Boldin, who had 102 (tied for third in the NFL) Fitzgerald's 1,409 yards, and Boldin’s 1,402 yards receiving were fourth and fifth in the NFL, respectively, in 2005. Boldin’s 100.1 receiving yards per game led the NFL.

The season also saw the Cardinals change their logo and uniforms, which remains in use today. It was also their final season playing at Sun Devil Stadium.

Offseason

NFL Draft

Personnel

Staff

Roster

Regular season

Schedule 
In the 2005 regular season, the Cardinals’ non-divisional, conference opponents were primarily from the NFC East, although they also played the Carolina Panthers from the NFC South, and the Detroit Lions from the NFC North. Their non-conference opponents were from the AFC South.

Note: Intra-division opponents are in bold text.

Season summary

Week 2 vs Rams

Standings

Notes

References 

Arizona Cardinals seasons
Arizona Cardinals
Arizona